Trechus kukunoricus is a species of ground beetle in the subfamily Trechinae. It was described by Belousov & Kabak in 2000.

References

kukunoricus
Beetles described in 2000